Gonzalezodoria is a genus of parasitic flies in the family Tachinidae. There are at least two described species in Gonzalezodoria.

Species
These two species belong to the genus Gonzalezodoria:
 Gonzalezodoria goniodes Cortes, 1971
 Gonzalezodoria gonioides Cortes, 1967

References

Further reading

 
 
 
 

Tachinidae
Articles created by Qbugbot